Parablennius cornutus, the horned blenny, is a species of combtooth blenny found in the southeast Atlantic ocean: northern Namibia to Sodwana Bay, South Africa.  This species can reach a length of  SL.

References

cornutus
Fish described in 1758
Taxa named by Carl Linnaeus
Fish of the Atlantic Ocean
Fish of South Africa